Jalaliyeh or Jalalieh may refer to:
 Jalaliyeh, Ardabil
 Jalaliyeh, Kerman
 Jalaliyeh Jonubi, Khuzestan Province
 Jalaliyeh Shomali, Khuzestan Province
 Jalalieh, Razavi Khorasan